This is a list of Leica cameras. Leica Camera AG is a German optics company which produces Leica cameras. The predecessor of the company, formerly known as Ernst Leitz GmbH, is now three companies: Leica Camera AG, Leica Geosystems AG, and Leica Microsystems AG, producing cameras, geosurvey equipment, and microscopes, respectively. The Leica cameras are grouped by camera model and year of release.

Point & Shoot

Rangefinder

SLR 
These series of cameras were mainly designed by Willi Wiessner.

References

Lists of photography topics